Link3 Technologies Ltd also known as Link3, is an IT and internet company based in Dhaka, Bangladesh.

History 
Link3 Technologies Ltd was founded in 2000 by Sheikh Raihan Ahmed & Sajjid Haider Pasha in Dhaka. Link3 is an official licensee of Bangladesh Telecom Regulatory Commission (BTRC) to provide nationwide Data Connectivity & Internet Service & Domestic Data Communication Service. It has obtained ISP license [license No.-BTRC/LL/ISP-Nationwide (10) Link3/2008-79] From BTRC.

Moreover, Link3 Technologies Limited acquired BTRC approved Internet Protocol Telephony Service Provider (IPTSP) license in September 2009. Since then Link3 Technologies Limited has been providing IP Telephony service to its valued customer. Link3 has state of the art voice over IP infrastructure for domestic and international telecommunication. Link3 has redundant connectivity with ICX (Inter Communication Exchange) for domestic Mobile/PSTN calls and with IGW (International Gateway) for ISD calls.

With the approval of BTRC for providing Domestic Data Communication, IPTS Link3 has built its nationwide network with the foot print of 64 Districts. Link3 Technologies Ltd. Has installed 262 individual PoP (Point of Presence) to build its nationwide network.

Expansion plan 
They have already applied to the Bangladesh Government to launch Native Communication Apps like WhatsApp & Viber.

See also 
 Bangladesh Telecommunication Regulatory Commission
 Bangladesh Telecommunications Company Limited

References

External links 
 Official website

Internet service providers of Bangladesh
Telecommunications companies of Bangladesh
Companies based in Dhaka
Technology companies established in 2000
Bangladeshi companies established in 2000